Kanehisa (written: 金久) is a Japanese surname. Notable people with the surname include:

, Japanese bioinformatician
, Japanese folklorist and linguist

Kanehisa (written: 兼久) is also a masculine Japanese given name. Notable people with the name include:

, Japanese baseball player

Japanese-language surnames
Japanese masculine given names